Friedrichroda is a town in the district of Gotha, Thuringia, Germany. It is situated at the north foot of the Thuringian Forest, 21 km by rail southwest of the town of Gotha. It is surrounded by fir-clad hills and possesses numerous handsome villa residences, a Kurhaus and a sanatorium. In the immediate neighborhood is the beautiful ducal hunting seat of Reinhardsbrunn, built out of the ruins of the famous Benedictine monastery founded in 1085. On 1 December 2007, the former municipalities Ernstroda and Finsterbergen were incorporated by Friedrichroda.

History
Within the German Empire (1871–1918), Friedrichroda was part of the Duchy of Saxe-Coburg and Gotha.

Development of first jet flying wing aircraft
During the late years of World War II, Friedrichroda was the site of manufacture of the mock-up production of the double-seat, all-weather fighter version of the Horten Ho 229 V4 and V5 (Versions 4 and 5) flying wing jet aircraft. The only surviving example of the Horten jet is the Horten Ho 229 V3. In December 2011, the Horten V3 was transferred to the Smithsonian Institution's Paul E. Garber Restoration Facility in Suitland, MD.

Gallery

Notable people 
 Karsten Albert (born 1968), luger
Marko Baacke (born 1980), Nordic combiner
Ilona Brand (born 1958 as Ilona Oeckel), luger
Christian Friedrich Ludwig Buschmann (1805–1864), musical instrument maker (Terpodion, Harmonium)
 Käte Duncker (1871–1953), politician, women's lawyer, visited the Higher School of Daughters
Johann Georg Eccarius (1818–1889), worker activist and trade unionist
 Katrin Göring-Eckardt (born 1966 as Katrin Dagmar Eckardt), politician (The Greens) and Vice Bundestag president 2005–2013
Ralph Gebstedt (born 1971), ski jumper
Tatjana Hüfner (born 1983), luger, Olympic champion in the single-seater
Sandra Hüller (born 1978), actress, grew up in Friedrichroda
Philipp Klewin (born 1993), footballer
Helene Lange (1848–1930), teacher and pioneer of women's education
Anna-Maria Müller (1949–2009), luger
 Auguste Schmidt (1833–1902), teacher and writer
 Melitta Sollmann (born 1958), luger
 Marion Thees (born 1984), skeleton pilot

See also
Reinhardsbrunn

References

External links 
 

Gotha (district)
Saxe-Coburg and Gotha